Karen Sharlow is a former judge of the Canadian Federal Court of Appeal. She served as the Acting Chief Justice for the Federal Court of Appeal from June to September, 2014.

Life
Sharlow graduated from Simon Fraser University in 1979 with her BA in Commerce and Economics.

References

Year of birth missing (living people)
Living people
Judges of the Federal Court of Appeal (Canada)
Place of birth missing (living people)
Canadian women judges